Gajah Gallery is an art gallery in Singapore that hosts artwork related to the socio-cultural interests of Asia. It was established in 1995 by Jasdeep Sandhu and promotes Southeast Asian Contemporary Art with an emphasis on Indonesian Contemporary. The gallery holds exhibitions, some of which have been collaborations with the Singapore Art Museum (SAM) and the National University of Singapore Museum (NUS). Gajah Gallery is also a member of Art Galleries Association in Singapore.

Description
Gajah Gallery displays, promotes and researches Southeast Asian art. The collection was previously housed at the MICA building, adjacent to Singapore City Hall and close to the Singapore Philatelic Museum, Singapore Art Museum and National Museum of Singapore.

The MICA building, formerly known as the Old Hill Street Police Station, was erected in 1934 to house the Hill Street Police Station and Barracks, and was gazetted as a national monument in 1998 and transformed into premises for MICA.

In 2015, Gajah Gallery moved to an even bigger space located at Tanjong Pagar Distripark. The new space features white walls over 18 ft high and 4500 sqft of floor space. It is situated in a fully operational shipping warehouse on the historic port of Tanjong Pagar.

Following that, Gajah Gallery also opened up a second space in Indonesia's arts capital, Yogyakarta. Yogya Art Lab (YAL) is an experimental platform for prominent and emerging artists to come together to produce works across various mediums such as paper, sculpture, performance and digital visual production. As for now, the lab has collaborated with established artists like Yunizar and Ashley Bickerton in producing some of their finest bronze and aluminium sculptures respectively.

Collections and exhibitions
Gajah Gallery focuses on displaying contemporary Southeast Asian art from the region, including art from Singapore. The Gallery exclusively represents six of the leading Indonesian contemporary artists, Nyoman Masriadi, Rudi Mantofani, Yunizar, Handiwirman Sahputra, Yusra Martunus and Jumaldi Alfi. This limited scope ensures that the Gallery fulfill's their primary mission which is to gain representation for the artist before increasing their stable of artists.

Fairs and Projects

Gajah Gallery contributes to research into Southeast Asian art. The gallery consistently exhibits in various local and international art fairs such as Art Basel Hong Kong, Art Stage Singapore, Art Stage Jakarta, Art Fair Philippines, Art Fair Tokyo, India Art Fair (formerly known as the India Art Summit) and Art021 Shanghai. The artists that they represent not only gain valuable exposure, but the fairs serve as a platform through which ideas are exchanged and better ties are built with other exhibitors.

Publications

Commemorative postcard set
A set of 15 postcards were designed as a commemorative piece for the gallery's 15th year anniversary celebration. The set is a compilation of work by Ahmad Zakii Anwar, J. Ariadhitya Pramuhendra, Jumaldi Alfi, M. Irfan, Mangu Putra, Nyoman Masriadi, Rudi Mantofani, Teng Nee Cheong and Yunizar.

Nyoman Masriadi, Reconfiguring the Body
Nyoman Masriadi's work Reconfiguring the Body offers a review of Nyoman Masriadi's works, his life and inspirations – through the words of art critics, TK Sabapathy and Goenawan Mohamed. Masriadi is Southeast Asia's most well-received contemporary artist. 

The visual imagery and narratives in his paintings are derived from observation of social life. Reactive against formalism, his early works show him sparring with Western modernism in the guise of cubism but meshing it with caricature, the cutting street language Indonesians use and graffiti. The wit and humor embodied in his works are shaped by the computer game culture that he grew up with. He overdraws finished paintings with a marker.

Nee Cheong, Those The Gods Love Grow Mightier
Teng Nee Cheong's book Those the Gods Love Grow Mightier offers an insight on the life, works and thoughts of renowned Singaporean artist Teng Nee Cheong that span a period of 40 years. Art critic TK Sabapathy, art curators Low Sze Wee and Lindy Poh, as well as Jasdeep Sandhu, Suteja Neka and Teng Nee Cheong himself, have provided a commentary, uncovering the artist's works, as well as inspirations that have influenced him.

Nee Cheong's works encapsulate the influences of culture and traditions around Asia by using symbols of Balinese mythology, Hinduism, and Buddhism.

Seeing Paintings: Conversations Before the End of History 
Seeing Paintings: Conversations Before the End of History highlights the development of painting in Indonesia over the past 70 years, from the late 30s – 40s to the late 90s – 2000, and the historical contributions by both artists and writers to painting in Indonesia. The artists included in the publication, such as Affandi, Oesman Effendi, Djoko Pekik, Lucia Hartini, Made Djirna, Mangu Putra and Yunizar, have contributed significantly to the field of history and are presented in a comparative framework. The publication shows the history of Indonesian art as a mode of discourse that consists of an intricate journey due to the process of acculturation and enculturation in the form of vocabulary, speech, criticism, polemics, writings, doctrine, bureaucracy, schools, social institutions, and so on.

Mangu Putra, Between History and Quotidian 
Mangu Putra: Between History & the Quotidian introduces the artist's efforts to re-examine historic archival footage of the Dutch colonisation in Bali in the early to mid 1900s and to draw together visual and verbal narratives to stage an untold account of history. With essays from art historian Adrian Vickers and curator Jim Supangkat, the publication explores how Putra re-imagines historic scenes, changing the emphasis by placing the Balinese people at the center, and shifts his attention towards the degradation of the natural world and the neglect of those who made Indonesia, as part of a search for spiritual meaning.

Semsar Siahaan, Art, Liberation 
Semsar Siahaan: Art, Liberation is the most extensive printed publication on the late Indonesian artist Semsar Siahaan – a seminal figure of the progressive movement in Indonesia, who tirelessly campaigned and used his art as a tool to advocate social justice. Art critics TK Sabapathy, Astri Wright and Aminudin TH Siregar discuss Siahaan's emergence and his art in relation to prevailing sociopolitical conditions. They propose perspectives for relooking at the often-overlooked artist, appraising him historically and projecting him with fresh impetus for critical attention, presently.

References

External links
 

Art museums and galleries in Singapore
Asian art museums in Singapore
Art galleries established in 1996
1996 establishments in Singapore